Double Panther is the third album released by Diego's Umbrella.

Track listing 
All song written, performed and arranged by Diego's Umbrella.

Personnel
 Tyson Maulhardt - Electric Guitar, Vocals
 Vaughn Lindstrom - Acoustic Guitar, Vocals
 Ben Leon - Vocals, Electric Guitar, Percussion
 Jason Kleinberg - Violin, Vocals, Accordion
 Jake Wood - Drums
 Kevin Blair - Bass
 Liz King - Soprano
 Chris Brown - Trumpet
 Joe Morais - Piano
 Brahm Sheray - Strings

Production
Produced by Diego's Umbrella
Recorded at Prairie Sun Studios, San Pablo Recorders and Awesometown
Engineered and Mixed by Bond Bergland and Diego's Umbrella
Mastered by Michael Romanowski

2009 albums
Diego's Umbrella albums